Sri  Nagar Legislative Assembly constituency is one of the 403 constituencies of the Uttar Pradesh Legislative Assembly, India. It is a part of the Lakhimpur district and one of the five assembly constituencies in  the Kheri Lok Sabha constituency. First election in this assembly constituency was held in 1957 after the "DPACO (1956)" (delimitation order) was passed in 1956. After the "Delimitation of Parliamentary and Assembly Constituencies Order" was passed in 2008, the constituency was assigned identification number 140.

Wards  / Areas
Extent  of Sri Nagar Assembly constituency is KCs Sharda Nagar, Sri Nagar, PCs  Manikapur, Saidapur Devkali, Saidapur Bhau, Kodhaiya, Rousa, Manoura,  Karanpur Kaimahra, Rukundipur, Kaimahra of Kheri Paila KC, PCs Bhaduri,  Choraha, Aithapur, Rampur Gokul, Dhourahra Khurd, Sanigawan, Bhalliya Buzurg,  Parsehra Buzurg, Atwa, Siyathu, Sisawakalan, Bijhouli, Umarpur, Shankarpur,  Semrai & Sherpur of Paila KC of Lakhimpur Tehsil.

Members of the Legislative Assembly

Election results

2022

2012
16th Vidhan Sabha: 2012 General  Elections

See also

Kheri Lok Sabha constituency
Lakhimpur Kheri district
Sixteenth Legislative Assembly of Uttar Pradesh
Uttar Pradesh Legislative Assembly
Vidhan Bhawan

References

External links
 

Assembly constituencies of Uttar Pradesh
Politics of Lakhimpur Kheri district
Constituencies established in 1956